Covington Municipal Airport  is a city-owned public-use airport located three miles (5 km) northeast of the central business district of Covington, a city in Tipton County, Tennessee, United States.

Facilities and aircraft 
For the 12-month period ending February 20, 1998, the airport had 24,500 aircraft operations, an average of 67 per day: 96% general aviation, 4% air taxi and <1% military. At that time there were 44 aircraft based at this airport: 98% single-engine and 2% multi-engine.

References

External links 
 COVINGTON MUNICIPAL - M04 AT Tennessee DOT
 

Airports in Tennessee
Buildings and structures in Tipton County, Tennessee
Transportation in Tipton County, Tennessee